The Nordic mixed team normal hill/3 × 3.3 km competition at the 2016 Winter Youth  Olympics in Lillehammer, Norway was held on 19 February at Lysgårdsbakken andBirkebeineren Ski Stadium.

Results

Ski jumping 
The ski jumping part was held at 11:00.

Cross-country 
The cross-country part was held at 13:30.

References 

Nordic mixed team normal hill 3 x 3.3 km